Hotman El Kababri (born 27 October 2000) is a professional footballer who plays as a left back for Lierse Kempenzonen on loan from Zulte Waregem) in the Belgian First Division B. Born in Belgium, El Kababri represents Morocco internationally.

Professional career
El Kababri made his professional debut for Anderlecht in a 1-2 Belgian First Division A defeat against K.V. Oostende on 28 July 2019.

International career
Born in Belgium, El Kababri is of Moroccan descent. He represented the Morocco U17s in 2016.

References

External links
 
 

Living people
2000 births
Moroccan footballers
Morocco youth international footballers
Belgian footballers
Belgium youth international footballers
Belgian sportspeople of Moroccan descent
R.S.C. Anderlecht players
Belgian Pro League players
Association football midfielders
People from Eupen
Footballers from Liège Province